In genealogy and wills, a person's issue is all their lineal descendants.

Lineal descendants
Issue typically means a person's lineal descendants—all genetic descendants of a person, regardless of degree. Issue is a narrower category than heirs, which includes spouses, and collaterals (siblings, cousins, aunts, and uncle)s. This meaning of issue arises most often in wills and trusts. A person who has no living lineal descendants is said to have died without issue.

A child or children are first-generation descendants and are a subset of issue.

See also
 Legitimacy (family law)
 Primogeniture
 Royal bastard
 Royal descent

References

Legal terminology